Zweiflingen is a town in the district of Hohenlohe in Baden-Württemberg in Germany.

Population
 1672: 140
 1807: 222
 1819: 216
 1880: 1106
 1939: 796
 1950: 1053
 1961: 912
 2005: 1723 
 2012: 1811

References

Hohenlohe (district)